Jauss is a surname. Notable people with the surname include:

Dave Jauss (born 1957), American baseball coach and scout
Georg Jauss (1867–1922), German painter
Hans-Robert Jauss (1921–1997), German philosopher

See also
JASS (disambiguation)